Jan Kamiński (born 18 September 1992) is a Polish equestrian. He competed in the 2020 Summer Olympics.

References

1992 births
Living people
People from Milanówek
Equestrians at the 2020 Summer Olympics
Polish male equestrians
Olympic equestrians of Poland
Event riders